This is a timeline of artists, albums, and events in progressive rock and its subgenres.  This article contains the timeline for the period 2010–2019.

Contents
2010 – 2011 – 2012 – 2013 – 2014 – 2015 – 2016 – 2017 – 2018 –
2019

 See also
 Links and references


2010

Newly formed bands 
 King Gizzard & the Lizard Wizard
 stOrk

Albums

Disbandments

Events
 Genesis were inducted into the Rock and Roll Hall of Fame.
 Mike Portnoy unexpectedly left Dream Theater due to a disagreement between the band members, resulting in Mike Mangini taking his place as the new drummer for Dream Theater.
 Emerson, Lake and Palmer reunited for a single show on their 40th anniversary, to headline the new born High Voltage Festival.
 Todd La Torre replaced Wade Black as the lead singer of Crimson Glory.
 In late 2010, Supertramp performed on a series of concerts through Europe.

2011

Newly formed bands 
 Hällas

Reformed bands
Igra Staklenih Perli

Albums

Disbandments
 Oceansize
 Pure Reason Revolution

Events
 Pink Floyd signed a new deal with EMI records and began massive Why Pink Floyd...? reissue campaign.
 Mike Mangini joined Dream Theater as new drummer.
 Thirty Seconds to Mars set a Guinness World Record for the most shows played during a single album cycle.
 Nick D'Virgilio left his duties as the lead vocalist and drummer for Spock's Beard and was replaced by Ted Leonard (Vocals) and Jimmy Keegan (Drums)... Keegan had played with the band previously as a touring drummer.

2012

Newly formed bands 
 Flying Colors
 Storm Corrosion
 Soen

Albums

Disbandments
 The Mars Volta

Events
 The Flower Kings returned from a 5-year hiatus to release their 12th studio album.
 Yes lead singer Benoît David left Yes due to respiratory illness and was replaced by Glass Hammer lead vocalist Jon Davison.
 Queensrÿche fired lead singer Geoff Tate after threats and physical altercations provoked by Tate. He was replaced by Crimson Glory vocalist Todd La Torre.

2013

Albums

Events
 Rush was inducted into the Rock and Roll Hall of Fame.
 Todd La Torre left Crimson Glory citing long periods of inactivity as his reason.
 Lindsay Cooper (Henry Cow, Comus, Feminist Improvising Group) died 18 September.
Richard Coughlan (The Wilde Flowers, Caravan) died 1 December.

2014

Albums

2015

Newly formed bands 
 Native Construct
 Lonely Robot
 Earthside

Albums

Disbandments

Events
In mid 2015, Supertramp announced they would be performing a 25-date tour throughout Europe, from November to December, this being their first tour in more than 4 years. Soon afterwards, however, the tour was cancelled due to the band's leader Rick Davies health problems. Ever since, there hasn't been news on a new Supertramp tour, much less a reunion with former co-frontman Roger Hodgson.

2016

Newly formed bands 
 Mantra Vega
 The John Hackett Band
 The Mute Gods
 Anderson/Stolt

Albums

Disbandments

 Beardfish

Events
 David Bowie died due to liver cancer on 10 January; only 2 days after his 69th birthday and the release of his final studio album Blackstar.
 On 21 February 2016, Riverside guitarist Piotr Grudziński died of a sudden heart-attack in Warsaw.  His bandmates announced later in September that they would carry on with the band as a three-piece and play their first show on the one-year anniversary of Grudziński's death as a tribute to the guitarist in 2017.
 Emerson, Lake & Palmer keyboardist Keith Emerson died of a self-inflicted gunshot wound on 11 March 2016.  A tribute show was held in his honor/legacy by his peers among the progressive rock community on 28 May 2016 in Los Angeles.
 Emerson, Lake & Palmer vocalist and guitar player Greg Lake died in London on 7 December 2016, at the age of 69, after suffering from cancer.

2017

Newly formed bands 
 The Nova Collective
 Sons of Apollo
 Vuur
 Others By No One

Albums

Disbandments

Events
 7–11 Feb.: Yes once again hosted their festival at sea, Cruise to the Edge. At the event ex-Dream Theater drummer Mike Portnoy performed his Twelve-step Suite for the first time in its entirety.

2018

Newly formed bands 

 Pattern-Seeking Animals
 The Sea Within

Albums

Events 

 The Moody Blues were inducted into the Rock and Roll Hall of Fame.

2019

Newly formed bands 

 In Continuum
 Overworld Dreams

Albums

See also
 Timeline of progressive rock: other decades: 1960s – 1970s – 1980s – 1990s – 2000s – 2020s
 Timeline of progressive rock (Parent article)
 Progressive rock
 Canterbury Scene
 Symphonic rock
 Avant-rock
 Rock in Opposition
 Neo-prog
 Progressive metal
 Jazz fusion
 Djent

References 

Timeline
Progressive rock
Progressive rock
Timeline of progressive rock
2010s in music
Music history by genre